The Easington Catchment Area (known as ECA) is a group of natural gas producing fields in the Southern North Sea. The fields are operated by Perenco.

Development 
The Easington Catchment Area project was developed in two phases. The £150 million first phase involved development of the Mercury (Block 47/9b) and Neptune (Blocks 47/4b and 47/5a) gas fields which had been discovered in 1983 and 1985 respectively. The ECA partners were, for the Neptune field: BG Exploration and Production Limited (61%), BP (18%), and Amerada Hess (21%); and for the Mercury Field: BG Exploration and Production Limited (73%) and Amerada Hess (27%).

The Neptune field was developed using three new wells, an existing well and a new NUI (normally unattended installation). The Mercury field was developed with a subsea installation with well fluids produced to the Neptune NUI via a 10-inch diameter pipeline. The Neptune platform consists of a 630 tonne jacket supporting a 681 tonne deck. From the Neptune platform co-mingled fluids are transported to a dedicated riser tower on the Cleeton installation via a 16-inch diameter pipeline. The gas is separated, dried and metered on Cleeton before transmission into the BP Cleeton/Dimlington pipeline system. A contract for the pipelines and subsea facilities, valued at around £23m, was awarded to ETPM UK. Methanol for hydrate formation inhibition is piped from Cleeton to the Neptune platform. First gas was produced in 1999.

Details of the first phase installations are summarised in the table.  

The production profile, in mcm/y, of the Neptune field was as shown.

Second phase 
The £270 million second phase of the ECA project, known as Juno, included the development of the Apollo (Block 47/4a), Artemis (Block 47/3), Minerva (Block 47/3), Whittle (Block 42/28b) and Wollaston (Block 42/28) gas fields. The majority stakeholder for the Juno fields was the BG Group.

The Minerva hub facilities consist of subsea production systems on Apollo and Artemis and a normally unattended installation (NUI) at Minerva. The Apollo subsea wells are tied back via a manifold and pipeline to the Minerva platform. The Artemis appraisal well is also tied back via a separate pipeline to the Minerva platform. Produced fluids from all three fields are co-mingled on the Minerva platform, and the combined flow exported via a 16-inch diameter pipeline to the BG-operated ECA riser tower bridge-linked to the Cleeton complex. The Wollaston and Whittle fields are developed via subsea wells and flowlines tied back via a manifold and a 12-inch diameter pipeline to the ECA riser tower, where they are co-mingled with the Minerva hub fluids. The first gas from the second phase was produced in 2003.

Apollo and Artemis are named from the Greek deities, Minerva from the Roman Deity, Whittle from Frank Whittle the inventor of the turbojet engine, and Wollaston from the Scientist William Hyde Wollaston. The second phase JUNO installations are summarised in the table.  

The production profile, in mcm/y, of the Apollo field was as shown.In 2009 BP acquired BG Group's share of the Juno fields. In 2012 BP sold its interests in the ECA fields and installations to Perenco.

See also 

 Easington Gas Terminal
 Planets gas fields
 List of oil and gas fields of the North Sea
Cleeton gas field and hub

References

External links

Natural gas fields in the United Kingdom

North Sea energy